Denekamp is a town in the Dutch province of Overijssel. It is a part of the region of Twente and the municipality of Dinkelland, and lies about 9 km northeast of Oldenzaal.

The town was first noted as early as the 10th century when it was referred to as Daginghem, and means "settlement of the people of Dago or Dano". The village started around the church which was built in 1275. It remained isolated and small until 1829 when the road from Deventer to Hamburg was built.

The location became a municipality in 1818 incorporating the settlements of Noord Deurningen, Lattrop, Breklenkamp, Tilligte, Nutter and Agelo. The municipality merged with Ootmarsum and Weerselo in 2001; the new municipality was first called "Denekamp", but was renamed in 2002 to Dinkelland.

The Town is known in the hardstyle scene, to be home of various Hardstyle DJ's.

Notable people from Denekamp
Roméo Dallaire (1946-), Canadian senator and retired general.
Hennie Kuiper (1949-), world champion cyclist.
Tanja Nijmeijer, FARC member.
Radical Redemption, Hardstyle producer and DJ.
Angerfist, Hardstyle producer and DJ.

Gallery

References

Municipalities of the Netherlands disestablished in 2002
Populated places in Overijssel
Former municipalities of Overijssel
Twente
Dinkelland